Changes is a 1969 American drama film directed and produced by Hall Bartlett.

Plot
Set in the 1960s, the film follows the lead character Kent (Kent Lane), as he travels along the California coast. As he drifts, he recalls his former troubled girlfriend, Bobbi (Manuela Thiess) who committed suicide after he broke off their relationship. During his travels he meets up with different women. However, he moves along rather than stay put in hopes of finding a meaning to his life.

Cast
 Kent Lane as Kent
 Michele Carey as Julie
 Jack Albertson as Kent's Father
 Manuela Thiess as Bobbi
 Marcia Strassman as Kristine
 Bill Kelly as Sammy
 Tom Holland as Roommate 
 Kenneth Washington as Black Motorist
 Emory Parnell as Man Seated At Lunchcounter
 Teri Garr as The Waitress

Soundtrack
The film includes two songs from the Tim Buckley album Goodbye and Hello on its soundtrack.

Reception
John Simon described Changes as 'an abomination'.  In the New York Times, Howard Thompson said "If "Changes" had a culminating dramatic effect equal to its perception and visual beauty, the picture [...] would be a masterpiece. Even so, it is one of the most imaginative, haunting and artistic movies yet made of contemporary youth at bay. It is a remarkable film and — more than that — a remarkable experience."

References

External links

 

1969 films
1969 drama films
Films directed by Hall Bartlett
American drama films
1960s English-language films
1960s American films